Kenneth Edward Gill (22 May 1932 – 16 February 2013) was an Anglican bishop who was the Assistant Bishop of Newcastle in the Church of England and the Diocesan Bishop of Central Karnataka in the Church of South India.

Gill was born to Fred and Elsie Gill, and attended Harrogate Grammar School in Harrogate, North Yorkshire. He married Edna Hammond in 1957, and they have three children: one son and two daughters. Gill studied at the Methodist training college Hartley Victoria College, Manchester, and was ordained a deacon in the Church of South India Diocese of Mysore in 1958 and a presbyter in 1960 – that church is a united church comprising (among others) Methodists and Anglicans. He remained in that diocese until 1972.

In 1972, Gill was consecrated bishop of the Diocese of Central Karnataka of the Church of South India, where he served until 1980, when he returned to the United Kingdom. In the Church of England, he became the first full-time ("stipendiary") Assistant Bishop of Newcastle until his 1998 retirement. He retired to Edinburgh and was licensed as an honorary assistant bishop in Newcastle diocese.

References

Sources

1932 births
2013 deaths
Assistant bishops of Newcastle (1980–2016)
Kannada people
20th-century Church of England bishops
20th-century Anglican bishops in India
Anglican bishops of Karnataka Central
Indian Christian theologians
People educated at Harrogate Grammar School